Cory Bailey is a former American football player and coach. He  as most recently the defensive line coach and recruiting coordinator and at Coastal Carolina University in Conway, South Carolina. A graduate of the Fordham University, Bailey was  the head football coach at Assumption College in Worcester, Massachusetts from 2004 to 2007 and again from 2009 to 2012, compiling a record of 32–50.

Head coaching record

References

Year of birth missing (living people)
Living people
American football centers
Assumption Greyhounds football coaches
Coastal Carolina Chanticleers football coaches
Fordham Rams football players
Iona Gaels football coaches
Rhein Fire players
High school football coaches in Massachusetts